Augustin Daniel Belliard, comte Belliard et de l'Empire (25 May 1769 in Fontenay-le-Comte, Vendée – 28 January 1832 in Brussels) was a French general.

Biography

Revolution
Belliard became an officer between 1792 and 1793 under Dumouriez in Belgium. He then fought under Hoche in Italy between 1796 and 1797, near Castiglione, Caldiero, Arcole, and promoted to général de brigade on the 18 November 1796.

A participant of the 1798 Egyptian expedition, he fought in the Battle of the Pyramids, became governor of Upper Egypt, and advanced with his troops into Nubia. He also fought back the enemy cavalry at the battle of Heliopolis. He played a major role in the taking of Bulal and Cairo. However, with the departure of Napoleon and the arrival of British troops under General Ralph Abercromby the situation changed for the French and the victories ended. After string of British victories Beliard became trapped in Cairo was besieged by a combined British and Ottoman force culminating with Belliard's surrender on 22 June 1801.

Empire

In 1805, Belliard fought against Austria, Prussia and Russia, under Joachim Murat.

King Joseph Bonaparte left Madrid with his 5,850-strong reserve on 23 July 1809 to fight at the Battle of Talavera. Wanting to face the combined British and Spanish army with his maximum strength, the king left Belliard, the governor of Madrid, with only about 4,000 troops. Belliard's force consisted of one brigade from the division of Jean-Joseph, Marquis Dessolles, and a few pro-French Spanish troops. Belliard had to be prepared to retreat into the Citadel of Madrid, in the Retiro, with his troops and the whole body of the Afrancesados and their families, if there was an insurrection, or if Venegas managed to reach the city from the east, or possibly Wilson, whose column was at Escalona (Toledo), just thirty-eight miles from Madrid, with a force that was believed to be much larger than it actually was. After his defeat at Talavera, Joseph ordered Belliard to send away all non-combatants from Madrid and prepare to defend the Retiro. However, Venegas failed to take advantage of his opportunity, Wilson's force was too weak, and the crisis passed.

During the Russian campaign in 1812, he fought at Dresden, Leipzig and Hanau, again under Murat. He was severely wounded in the battle of Craonne.

After Napoleon was overthrown, Louis XVIII awarded him the title Peer of France (Pair de France). When Napoleon returned from Elba in 1815, Belliard became commander of the Mosel forces. After the Battle of Waterloo, he surrendered to Louis XVIII, had his title Pair taken away, was imprisoned for month, but then released and reinstated as Pair in 1819.

The Rue Belliard/Belliardstraat in Brussels is named after him, as is a street in Antwerp.

Notes

References

1769 births
1832 deaths
People from Fontenay-le-Comte
Counts of the First French Empire
Orléanists
Members of the Chamber of Peers of the Bourbon Restoration
Members of the Chamber of Peers of the Hundred Days
Members of the Chamber of Peers of the July Monarchy
Politicians from Pays de la Loire
Ambassadors of France to Belgium
French generals
French Republican military leaders of the French Revolutionary Wars
French commanders of the Napoleonic Wars
Burials at Père Lachaise Cemetery
Names inscribed under the Arc de Triomphe